Sterculia cinerea is a species of plant in the family Malvaceae. It is found in Eritrea, Ethiopia, and Sudan.

References

cinerea
Near threatened plants
Taxonomy articles created by Polbot